The 2013 Biathlon Junior World Championships was held in Obertilliach, Austria from January 25 to February 1 2013. There was to be a total of 16 competitions: sprint, pursuit, individual, mass start, and relay races for men and women.

Medal winners

Youth Women

Junior Women

Youth Men

Junior Men

Medal table

References

External links
Official IBU website 

Biathlon Junior World Championships
2013 in biathlon
2013 in Austrian sport
International sports competitions hosted by Austria
2013 in youth sport